Rémy Cointreau is a French, family-owned business group whose origins date back to 1724. The group has an international portfolio of spirits (cognac, liqueurs and spirits): Rémy Martin and Louis XIII cognacs, Cointreau liqueur, METAXA Greek spirit, Mount Gay rum, St-Rémy brandy, The Botanist gin, Bruichladdich single malts, Port Charlotte, Octomore, Westland American whiskey and Domaine des Hautes Glaces French whisky.

Brands and history 
Rémy Cointreau brands include: 
 Rémy Martin cognac 
 Louis XIII cognac
 Mount Gay Rum (1989 acquisition) 
 Cointreau liqueur
 METAXA Greek spirit 
 Bruichladdich / Octomore / Port Charlotte Scotch whisky (2012 acquisitions)
 St-Rémy French brandy
 The Botanist gin (2012 acquisition)
 Domaine des Hautes Glaces French single malt whisky
 Westland American single malt whiskey

The Rémy Cointreau Group is a result of a 1990 merger between E. Rémy Martin & Cie SA and Cointreau & Cie SA, respectively.

In 1999, Rémy Cointreau joined Edrington and Fortune Brands in the creation of a global distribution network (outside the United States). The co-enterprise, named Maxxium, joined Vin & Sprit in 2001. In April 2009, Rémy Cointreau left Maxxium and created its own international distribution network.

In July 2011, Rémy Cointreau sold Piper-Heidsieck and Charles Heidsieck champagnes to French luxury goods group EPI for 422 million euros.

In 2012, Rémy Cointreau acquired Bruichladdich for £58m.

In January 2017, Rémy Cointreau announced two acquisitions: Westland Distillery, an American single malt whisky distillery based in Seattle, and Domaine des Hautes Glaces, an organic single malt whisky distillery in the French Alps.

Over the 2017-2018 fiscal year, the Rémy Cointreau Group turnover was 1,127 million euros. Over the 2017-2018 fiscal year, the Rémy Cointreau Group net income (excluding non-reoccurring items) was 151.3 million euros.

References

External links 
 Official website
 History of Rémy Cointreau

Distilleries in France
Food and drink companies based in Paris
Manufacturing companies based in Paris
Conglomerate companies of France
French brands
Companies listed on Euronext Paris